The mandaloun is a term given to a type of mullioned window. The mandaloun is an element of the traditional architecture of Lebanon that first appeared in the 17th-century stately mansions and later in the vernacular houses of the mountains of Lebanon.

Etymology
The term mandaloun is of unknown origin and does not derive from any Arabic verbal root. Friedrich Ragette, an author of a book on Lebanese architecture, indicates an Italian origin and links the term to the Italian mandolino, a musical instrument in the lute family. Ragette inferred that the mandaloun's disposition and location was favorable to the instrument player, thus the naming. This theory is reinforced by the fact that Italian was the most widely spoken foreign language by the notables as remarked by Gerard de Nerval in his 1851 voyage account, Voyage en Orient.

Le prince me parla longtemps de sa famille, des voyages que son grand-père avait faits en Europe et des honneurs qu'il y avait obtenus. Il s'exprimait fort bien en italien, comme la plupart des émirs et des cheiks du Liban...

History

In 1608, prince Fakhr-al-Din II of Lebanon concluded a secret economic and military alliance with the Grand Duke of Tuscany against the Ottoman hegemony. Alarmed, the Ottomans dispatched the Muhafiz of Damascus to mount an attack on Lebanon in order to reduce Fakhr-al-Din's growing power. Fakhr-al-Din chose to seek exile in Italy from 1613 until 1618 where he was hosted by  Cosimo II de' Medici, Grand Duke of Tuscany.  Fakhr-al-Din stayed in pope Leo X's apartment at the Palazzo Vecchio and later in the Palazzo Medici Riccardi; he was also received by Cosimo II in the Palazzo Pitti where he was exposed to Florentine architecture particularly the biforas, a type of mullioned windows that garnered the facades of the Florentine Renaissance palaces.

Before returning from exile, Fakhr al-Din appealed for a long list of artisans at the court of the Medici but only four came to Lebanon. The artisans who arrived in 1631 counted Cioli, a sculptor and Fagni an engineer. These artisans who introduced elements of Italian architecture, including the bifora had to leave Lebanon precipitately in 1633 when Fakhr al-Din was deposed. One of the earliest known monuments to hold a variant of the bifore which would be known locally as mandaloun was Burj al-Kashaf, a watch tower built by Fakhr al-Din at the outskirts of the walled city of Beirut; the tower was destroyed in 1870.

Description
The mandaloun was built with local limestone and consists of a vertical, fine column forming a division between two units of a window. The traditional mandaloun is always surmounted by a  discharging arch and is often coupled with hanging flower boxes. Mandalouns were usually  located in a prominent part of  houses and palaces.

References

Bibliography
 
 
 
 
 

Architecture in Lebanon
Windows
Architectural elements